is a Japanese physician-scientist and immunologist. He won the 2018 Nobel Prize in Physiology or Medicine and is  best known for his identification of programmed cell death protein 1 (PD-1).
He is also known for his molecular identification of cytokines: IL-4 and IL-5, as well as the discovery of activation-induced cytidine deaminase (AID) that is essential for class switch recombination and somatic hypermutation.

He was elected as a foreign associate of the National Academy of Sciences of the United States (2001), as a member of German Academy of Natural Scientists Leopoldina (2003), and also as a member of the Japan Academy (2005).

In 2018, he was awarded the Nobel Prize in Physiology or Medicine along with James P. Allison. He and Allison together had won the 2014 Tang Prize in Biopharmaceutical Science for the same achievement.

Life and career 

Honjo was born in Kyoto in 1942. He completed his M.D. degree in 1966 from the Faculty of Medicine, Kyoto University, where in 1975 he received his Ph.D. degree in Medical Chemistry under the supervision of Yasutomi Nishizuka and Osamu Hayaishi.

Honjo was a visiting fellow at the Department of Embryology, Carnegie Institution of Washington, from 1971 to 1973.  He then moved to the U.S. National Institutes of Health (NIH) in Bethesda, Maryland, where he studied the genetic basis for the immune response at the National Institute of Child Health and Human Development as a fellow between 1973 and 1977, followed by many years as an NIH Fogarty Scholar in Residence starting in 1992.  During part of this time, Honjo also was an assistant professor at the Faculty of Medicine, University of Tokyo, between 1974 and 1979; a professor in the Department of Genetics, Osaka University School of Medicine, between 1979 and 1984; and professor in the Department of Medical Chemistry, Kyoto University Faculty of Medicine, from 1984 to 2005.  Since 2005 Honjo has been a professor in Department of Immunology and Genomic Medicine, Kyoto University Faculty of Medicine. He was the President of Shizuoka Prefecture Public University Corporation from 2012 to 2017.

He is a member of the Japanese Society for Immunology and served as its president between 1999 and 2000.  Honjo is also an honorary member of American Association of Immunologists.  In 2017 he became Deputy Director-General and Distinguished Professor of Kyoto University Institute for Advanced Study (KUIAS).

COVID-19 pandemic
During the COVID-19 pandemic, a false claim that Honjo believed that the novel coronavirus had been "manufactured" by a laboratory in the Chinese city of Wuhan was widely disseminated on the internet in many languages. The BBC Reality Check team reported that, "In a statement published on the website of Kyoto University, he said he was 'greatly saddened' that his name had been used to spread 'false accusations and misinformation'.

Contribution 

Honjo has established the basic conceptual framework of class switch recombination. He presented a model explaining antibody gene rearrangement in class switch and, between 1980 and 1982, verified its validity by elucidating its DNA structure. He succeeded in cDNA clonings of IL-4 and IL-5 cytokines involved in class switching and IL-2 receptor alpha chain in 1986, and went on further to discover AID in 2000, demonstrating its importance in class switch recombination and somatic hypermutation.

In 1992, Honjo first identified PD-1 as an inducible gene on activated T-lymphocytes, and this discovery significantly contributed to the establishment of cancer immunotherapy principle by PD-1 blockade.

Awards 

Honjo has received several awards and honors in his life. In 2016, he won the Kyoto Prize in Basic Sciences for "Discovery of the Mechanism Responsible for the Functional Diversification of Antibodies, Immunoregulatory Molecules and Clinical Applications of PD-1". In 2018, he shared the Nobel Prize in Physiology or Medicine with American immunologist  James P. Allison. They previously also shared the Tang Prize in Biopharmaceutical Science in 2014.

The other major awards and honors received by Honjo are:
 1981 – Noguchi Hideyo-Memorial Award for Medicine
 1981 – Asahi Prize
 1984 – Kihara Prize, Genetics Society of Japan
 1984 – Osaka Science Prize
 1985 – Erwin von Baelz Prize
 1988 – Takeda Medical Prize
 1992 – Behring-Kitasato Award
 1993 – Uehara Prize
 1996 – Imperial Prize of the Japan Academy
 2000 – Person of Cultural Merit
 2001 – Foreign Associate of U.S. National Academy of Sciences.
 2012 – Robert Koch Prize
 2013 – Order of Culture
 2014 – William B. Coley Award
 2015 – Richard V. Smalley, MD Memorial Award
 2016 – Kyoto Prize
 2016 – Keio Medical Science Prize
 2016 – Fudan-Zhongzhi Science Award
 2016 – Thomson Reuters Citation Laureates
 2017 – Warren Alpert Foundation Prize
 2018 – Nobel Prize in Physiology or Medicine

References

External links 

 
 Tasuku Honjo Lab, Kyoto University Graduate School of Medicine
 Profile: Tasuku Honjo, Kyoto University Institute for Advanced Study
 

1942 births
Living people
Japanese biochemists
Japanese immunologists
Academic staff of the University of Tokyo
Academic staff of Osaka University
Academic staff of Kyoto University
Kyoto University alumni
Laureates of the Imperial Prize
Kyoto laureates in Basic Sciences
Recipients of the Order of Culture
Foreign associates of the National Academy of Sciences
Members of the German Academy of Sciences Leopoldina
Members of the Japan Academy
Nobel laureates in Physiology or Medicine
Japanese Nobel laureates